The Communist Party of Norway (NKP) is a communist party in Norway.

The NKP was formed in 1923, following a split in the Norwegian Labour Party. It was Stalinist from its establishment and, as such, supported the Soviet government while opposing Trotskyism.

During the Second World War, the NKP initially opposed active resistance to the German occupation, in deference to the non-aggression pact between the Soviet Union and Germany. Once Germany terminated the pact and attacked the Soviet Union, the Communist Party of Norway joined the resistance.

As a result of its role in the anti-Nazi struggle, the NKP experienced a brief surge in popularity immediately after the war, but popular sympathy waned with the onset of the Cold War. The ruling Labour Party took a hard line against the communists, culminating in Prime Minister Einar Gerhardsen's 1948 condemnatory Kråkerøy speech. Norwegian authorities considered the party an extremist organization, and its activities would be closely monitored by the Police Surveillance Agency throughout the Cold War.

Ideologically, the NKP has evolved since its founding. It followed Khrushchev's lead by formally denouncing Stalin's rule after his death in 1953, but remained pro-Soviet until the end of the Cold War, despite occasional instances of disagreement. After the collapse of the Soviet Union, the party has recognized some of the flaws of the Soviet model. It nonetheless supports traditional Soviet historiography and pro-Russian political views, opposing NATO, the European Union and the United States.

The NKP has been a marginal force in Norwegian politics since the late 1940s. It held a single seat in the parliament as late as 1961, but it has not been represented in any elected bodies in the last decades. In the 2017 parliamentary elections, it received only 309 votes.

History

Background, establishment  , and pre-war era

The Norwegian Labour Party (DNA) became a member of the Communist International (Comintern) in 1919 under the leadership of Martin Tranmæl. While Tranmæl at first supported the move of becoming a Comintern member, he became increasingly skeptical of it after the proclamation of the twenty-one conditions which stated that members had to enforce democratic centralism and party discipline. Even so, Tranmæl continued to support the Labour Party's membership, even if that meant a future split within the party between the left and the right. A split occurred, based on factional lines, in 1921 and led to the establishment of the Social Democratic Labour Party. A power struggle soon erupted between the Tranmælists and the supporters of Olav Scheflo, the party's parliamentary leader, following Kyrre Grepp's sickness leave and later death in 1922. The reason for the struggle was that Tranmæl wanted to block Grepp's chance of becoming the party's next leader; Grepp was a supporter of the Comintern-line.

By the time of the 4th World Congress of the Comintern, in which a policy of strengthening the apparatus of the member parties took place, Tranmæl had enough of what he saw as the Comintern's meddling in the internal affairs of the Labour Party. He managed to get a majority within the Central Board for a withdrawal of its Comintern membership, but the Comintern's representative, Karl Radek, managed, with a bit of maneuvering, to get the majority of the party's National Board to vote in favour of retaining its Comintern membership. Before the Labour Party conference in February 1921, Tranmæl came up with the Kristiania-proposal, a declaration of semi-independence from Comintern. The Kristiania-proposal supported retaining membership in the Comintern, if the Labour Party could operate on more independent lines. At the conference a majority, by a margin of two votes, voted in favour of the Kristiania-proposal. The Comintern representative at the party conference, Nikolai Bukharin, grudgingly accepted the vote. The power struggle between the Tranmælists and the Scheflo-wing continued, even more aggressively, until the extraordinary party conference of November 1923 which voted in favour of withdrawing the Labour Party from the Comintern. As a reaction, the Scheflo-wing left the party and established the Norwegian Communist Party. Organisationally, the Communist Party continued the representation of Norway in the Comintern.

13 of the Labour members of parliament joined the Communist Party, as did large parts of the trade union opposition to the Labour Party. The newly established party elected Sverre Støstad as chairman, Halvard Olsen as deputy chairman, and Peder Furubotn as general secretary. The party managed to gain 6.1 percent of the votes in the 1924 parliamentary election, but decreased to 4 percent in 1927, and decreased further in 1930 to 1.7 percent of the votes. At the same time, its membership slowly decreased, and by the 1930s the party had lost much of its former influence.

The 1924 election was a failure for the party; the party became the third largest left-wing party, behind the Labour Party and the Social Democratic Labour Party. The Communist Party had failed to restrengthened the Comintern organisation in Norway after the 1923-split. The 1925 conference focused on the party's organisational structure; the Comintern had laid out the party's organisational structure. The structure proposed by the Comintern was duly accepted by a majority at the conference.

Parallel to its decreasing electoral influence, the party was ravaged by internal strifes. Halvard Olsen and other trade union leaders left the party in 1924, in protest over the trade union policy of the Communist Party. Sverre Støstad, Fredrik Monsen, and Olav Larssen were excluded from the party in 1927 because of disagreements surrounding the reunification of Labour Party (which merged with the Social Democratic Labour Party). Jeanette Olsen, Emil Stang Jr., and Scheflo left the party in 1928, as they were disappointed with how the Communist Party reacted towards the first DNA government, Hornsrud's Cabinet. In 1927 the Mot Dag-group, a circle of leftwing intellectuals, joined the party. They would leave the following year, as the Communist Party took an 'ultra-left turn'.

The Comintern demanded in the summer of 1927 that the Communist Party move further to the left. The move to the left was characterised by a more open "class against class politics, in which the social democrats were designated as the primary enemy" of communism. At the 9th Plenum of the Central Committee in 1928, they denounced the right-wing faction for supporting the Labour government of Christopher Hornsrud. The 9th Plenum led to a further reduction of party members, but Furobotn and the Communist Party continued to be loyal to the line set by the Comintern. There was no significant dissent within the party against the Comintern line, and the party became vehemently loyal to it; it began to accuse the Labour Party of being social fascist, and further claimed that the Labour Party had stopped being a workers party. This policy led to further marginalisation of the Communist Party by the 1930s. In 1930 the Comintern directly interfered into the affairs of the Communist Party, when it ordered Furubotn, the party chairman, to visit the Soviet Union. In 1933 the party took the initiative to propose a collaboration with the Labour in the 1933 parliamentary election in correlation with the Comintern's policy of a Popular Front. The proposal was rejected, but the Communist Party continued to propose a collaboration of sorts to the Labour Party in 1935, 1936, and in 1937. The Labour Party continued to be interested in such a proposal as long as the Communist Party and itself were unified organisationally. From 1938 onwords, the party's relations with other parties reached an all-time low, and by the time of the German invasion of Norway in 1940, the party was in a crisis. The Norwegian public had begun to see the Communist Party as a tool controlled by Moscow.

Second World War
At the onset of the Second World War, NKP subscribed to the Molotov–Ribbentrop Pact between Germany and the Soviet Union. The DNA government, on the other hand, aligned with the United Kingdom. During the Finnish Winter War, NKP supported the Soviet war effort, whereas DNA supported the opposing side. DNA-NKP relations deteriorated further, reaching a historic low.

Germany invaded Norway on 9 April 1940. The NKP publication Arbeideren ("The Worker") proclaimed that the war was an imperialist war, and that Germany and the Western powers were equally responsible for its outbreak. According to that analysis the party should not take sides for one of the imperialist powers, a policy that was in clear opposition of the (then exiled) DNA government.

However, locally NKP cells in northern Norway began (without the consent of the party leadership) to mobilize resistance activities.

In August 1940, NKP was the first Norwegian political party to be banned by the German occupation authorities. The publication of Arbeideren ceased. The party then went underground. However, the party was poorly prepared for underground functioning.

In the ongoing confusion within the party, Furubotn began to call for more active resistance by NKP against the occupation. Furubotn had spent several years in Moscow, but had returned to Norway just before the war. Now he was the leader of the party in Vestlandet. On 31 December 1941, the party held a clandestine national conference, which adopted Furubotn's 'active war politics'.

NKP came to play a leading role in the resistance movement, organizing sabotage and guerrilla activities. However, although different sectors of the resistance showed a united front towards the occupants, the relation between NKP and the Home Front, the government-in-exile, and the clandestine trade union movement were not always smooth as the government only proposed peaceful resistance, like newspapers and intelligence support towards the allies, until the last years of the war, when these elements of resistance were to join actively. Generally, NKP wanted to adopt more offensive tactics against the occupants. It also created an illegal newspaper, Friheten, or "Liberty", which is still in print.

Postwar resurgence
After the war, NKP enjoyed a strong boost of popularity for its role in resistance struggle. The role the Soviet Union had played in defeating Germany, and in particular the Soviet liberation of Finnmark in northern Norway, also contributed to the popularity of the party.

In the national unity government formed after the war, two communists were included: Johan Strand Johansen and Kirsten Hansteen. Hansteen was the first female minister in Norwegian history. The party organ, Friheten, would reach a readership of approximately 100,000 directly after the war. In the new postwar atmosphere of tolerance, discussions were raised over a possible reunification between DNA and NKP. During the war, discussions had taken place in the Grini concentration camp between captured DNA and NKP leaders (including Einar Gerhardsen from DNA and Jørgen Vogt from NKP). However, these plans were discarded by Furubotn.

In the 1945 parliamentary election the NKP vote-share reached its historical peak. NKP received 176,535 votes (11.89%) and eleven seats in the Storting. In 1946 Furubotn was elected general secretary of NKP.

Onset of the Cold War
However, the growth of the party proved to be brief. The Cold War began, and the Norwegian government aligned itself with the Western powers. In the 1949 parliamentary election NKP lost many voters. The party received 102,722 votes (5.83%).

The reason for the party's decline in popularity is often accredited to Labour Party Prime Minister Einar Gerhardsen's famous speech at Kråkerøy in 1948, four days after the communist takeover in Czechoslovakia. In it, he condemned the actions in Czechoslovakia, but also warned that the same thing could happen in Norway if the Communist Party was given too much power. The speech represented the start of both an open and underground campaign against the party and its members, with the purpose of scaring away voters, and reducing its influence in the labour movement.

At the same time the party would experience its most traumatic internal division. In 1946 some of Furubotn’s closest associates during the war, Kjell G. Kviberg and Ørnulf Egge, were expelled. In 1949 Furubotn's enemies within the party began a campaign to expel him.

On 24 October 1949, MP Johan Strand Johansen publicly declared that a division existed within the party in a speech to the local party unit in Malerne. The following day Furubotn’s followers resigned from their positions in the party. On 26 October Furubotn and his followers in the party were expelled. The editorial of Friheten on 27 October proclaimed that "It has emerged clearly that this anti-party centre is a Trotskyist, bourgeois nationalist and Titoist centre, which has paralysed the central board with endless and futile discussions." Moreover, in an article in the same newspaper published on 11 November 1949, read that: "It is clear that within our party there are nationalist, petty bourgeois, Trotskyist, Titoist elements, enemies of the Soviet Union and socialism, that may form a base for recruitment of agents to the bourgeois states and the counter revolution." This process contributed to the ongoing political isolation of NKP. The expulsion of Furubotn, considered as a hero of the resistance struggle, was in many ways a political suicide. The way the expulsions had taken place, and the strong language used in the NKP press against the expellees, contributed to giving an image of NKP as a 'conspirational' party.

Cold War years
The NKP was broadly considered to be a loyal follower of the Communist Party of the Soviet Union, although it occasionally took independent positions opposing the Soviet line. This happened in 1968, when NKP condemned the Soviet-led invasion of Czechoslovakia. The youth league, Young Communist League of Norway (NKU), used to follow a somewhat more independent line than the party.

In the mid-1960s the U.S. State Department estimated the party membership to be approximately 4500 (0.2% of the working age population of the country).

In the parliamentary elections of 1973, the party participated in an electoral alliance with the Socialist People's Party and other left-wing groups, known as the Socialist Electoral League, and had its leader, Reidar Larsen, elected into parliament. In 1975, the Socialist Electoral League became the Socialist Left Party, which is today Norway's largest left-wing party to the left of the Norwegian Labour Party. The Communist Party took part in the process of transforming the electoral league to a new party, but in the end decided to remain a separate party after all. At the party congress in 1975 113 delegates voted to keep the party as an independent party, whereas 30 voted for merging it into SV. Larsen did not stand for re-election, and Martin Gunnar Knutsen was elected as the new party chairman. After the congress, Larsen and others left NKP to join the Socialist Left Party.

After Mikhail Gorbachev gained power in the Soviet Union and started his reform program, NKP, as most other European Communist parties did, started revising its views of past Soviet policies. The party started distancing itself from the practises of the Soviet Union, and focused on a "softer" communism. The term "democratic socialism" is frequently found in party literature from the early 1990s onward.

Post-Soviet world
Around 1990 there were also tendencies within NKP working for regroupment. In the 1989 parliamentary election they joined forces with Workers' Communist Party (AKP), Red Electoral Alliance (RV), and independent socialist to form Fylkeslistene for miljø og solidaritet (County lists for Environment and Solidarity). NKP also had joint lists with RV some places in the early 1990s, while at other places members of NKP campaigned for RV. This policy of unity was, however, abandoned around the mid-1990s.

A defining moment in this process came when the party opposed the Soviet coup attempt of 1991 against Gorbachev by the "old guard" of the Soviet communist party.

Today, the party's statement of principles explicitly acknowledges that the Soviet Union represented a violation of democratic principles and that the party has to take responsibility for its lack of criticism of these problems. The party does however still view these countries as examples of socialism and progress over the respective countries' preceding regimes.

Even though NKP did survive the collapse of the Soviet Union, inner turmoil, and particularly lack of recruitment amongst youth has since marginalized the party further.

In the early 1990s the party attempted to counteract some of this by electing younger leaders to the party's top positions. However, this move failed to boost recruiting much, and subsequently the party's leadership was again dominated by older members, many of whom joined during the Soviet era.

NKP won three elected posts in the 2003 municipal elections, two seats in the municipal council in Åsnes and one in Vadsø. The Åsnes branch, by far the party's strongest at that time, left the party in 2004 to form Radical Socialists due to disagreements over the questions of religion, Joseph Stalin, and cooperation with other leftist groups. In addition, an NKP member was a member of the Porsgrunn municipal council, elected on the RV-list until he joined RV. In later elections NKP has received about 1,000 votes. In the 2005 parliamentary election, it won 1,070 votes - 0.04% of the national total. In 2007, it could not find enough candidates for a list in Vadsø, and thus does not currently have any democratically elected representatives.

In 2006-2008 NKP's youth league was changed from the old Young Communist League of Norway, to the new Young Communist League in Norway. The new league changed its name in 2008 to the Youth Communists in Norway.

The party still publishes a weekly paper called Friheten ("The Freedom"), which was started as a clandestine paper in 1941.

Organization

Press
The party won control of eleven of the Labour Party newspapers. These were (some with new names after the communist takeover): Arbeidet, Ny Tid, Arbeideren, Vestfold Arbeiderblad, Glomdalens Arbeiderblad, Bratsberg-Demokraten, Fritt Folk, Follo Arbeiderblad, Gudbrandsdalens Arbeiderblad, Hardanger Arbeiderblad and Ny Dag. The communist party also usurped Møre Arbeiderblad, which had not yet achieved official Labour Party status. Nordlys was acquired, temporarily lost in mid-November 1923, then published as communist again until 20 January 1924 when it again became aligned with Labour. Some newspapers, such as Østerdalens Arbeiderblad had sympathized with the communist opposition while it was a part of the Labour Party, but after the actual split the Labour Party managed to turn the tide and retain them. The Communist Party also took over the ideological publication Klassekampen (belonged to the Young Communist League of Norway) and started Gnisten and Proletaren. Newly established communist newspapers within the party's first year of existence were the main organ Norges Kommunistblad as well as Akershus Folkeblad, Buskerud-Arbeideren, Friheten, Troms Fylkes Kommunistblad, Dagens Nyheter and Finnmark Fremtid. Many became defunct after a short time.

The Communist Party also had a range of company newspapers, for laborers in specific companies or specific industries. In Oslo there were Arbeidersken, Brygger'n, Den unge arbeider, Hammer'n, Huken, Kommunarden, Nødsarbeideren (renamed Steinspruten), Skyttelen, Sporvekselen and Stemplet. In Bergen there were Byggeren, Hermetikboksen, Kommuneproletaren and Transportproletaren (renamed Havnearbeideren). In Trondheim there were Filkloa and Signal. Einhart Lorenz has also registered seventeen other company newspapers from across the country. Nearly all were founded in 1925 or 1926, and nearly all went defunct between 1925 and 1928. The only exception as to foundation was Verksteds-Arbeideren, founded in Drammen in 1924, and the only newspaper which survived beyond 1928 was Kommuneproletaren, which existed until 1931.

Leaders
 Sverre Støstad (1923–1925)
 Peder Furubotn (1925–1930)
 Henry W. Kristiansen (1931–1934)
 Adam Egede-Nissen (1934–1946)
 Emil Løvlien (1946–1965)
 Reidar T. Larsen (1965–1975)
 Martin Gunnar Knutsen (1975–1982)
 Hans I. Kleven (1982–1987)
 Kåre André Nilsen (1987–1991)
 Ingve Iversen (1991–1993)
 Collective leadership (1993–2000)
 Terje Krogh, Per Lothar Lindtner and Kjell Underlid (1993–1998)
 Per Lothar Lindtner and Kjell Underlid (1998–2000) 
 Per Lothar Lindtner (2000–2001)
 Zafer Gözet (2001–2010)
 Svend Haakon Jacobsen (2010–2013)
 Jørgen Hovde (2013–2014)
 Runa Evensen (2014–present)

Popular support and electoral results
Currently, the party retains its strongest bases of support in Oslo, Finnmark, Troms, Tromsø, and Namsos. Historically Åsnes and Trondheim were strongholds of the party.

Storting (parliament)

Notes:

County Councils

References

Bibliography

External links
 Norges kommunistiske parti - Official website
 Prinsipprogram - Statement of principles
 Friheten - Party newspaper
 Ungkommunistene -Party youth league
 Communist Party of Norway - Information in English

 
Norway
Political parties established in 1923
1923 establishments in Norway
Communist parties in Norway
Far-left politics in Norway
International Meeting of Communist and Workers Parties